Altor may refer to:
 Altor (given name)
 Altor Equity Partners, a firm
 Altor Networks, cybersecurity business